Felipe Silva may refer to:
Felipe França Silva (born 1987), Brazilian breaststroke swimmer
Felipe Lourenço da Silva (born 1990), Brazilian volleyball player
Felipe Silva (water polo) (born 1984), Brazilian water polo player
Felipe da Silva (died 1644), Portuguese soldier in the service of Spain
Felipe Silva (rugby union) (born 1986), Brazilian rugby sevens player
Felipe Silva (footballer) (born 1990), Brazilian footballer
Felipe Machado Silva (born 1998), Brazilian basketball player
Felipe Silva (fighter) (born 1984), Brazilian mixed martial arts fighter